John Christopher Slemin (29 November 1881 – 1939) was an Irish footballer who played as an outside left.

Career
Slemin was born in 1881, in Dublin. He began his career as an amateur at Bohemians, whilst also working as a fitter. With Bohemian he won the Irish Cup in 1907–08, and was a runner-up in 1908–09. He was also capped by Ireland amateurs in 1908, and by Ireland in 1909.

He signed for Bradford City in May 1909, making 3 league appearances for the club, before being released in 1910.

He later played for Distillery.

He died in Dublin in 1939, aged 57.

Sources

References

1881 births
1939 deaths
Date of death missing
Irish association footballers (before 1923)
Pre-1950 IFA international footballers
Bohemian F.C. players
Bradford City A.F.C. players
Lisburn Distillery F.C. players
English Football League players
Association football outside forwards
Association footballers from Dublin (city)